The 1956 Columbia Lions football team was an American football team that represented Columbia University as a member of the Ivy League during the 1956 NCAA University Division football season. 

In their 27th and final season under head coach Lou Little, the Lions compiled a 3–6 record and were outscored 237 to 94. Arthur Wilson was the team captain.  

The Lions' 2–5 conference record tied for sixth place in the Ivy League. This was the first season of formal play for the league, although the Lions' previous  independent schedules, dating back to the 19th century, often featured future Ivy opponents. Six of the seven Ivy matchups on Columbia's 1956 schedule had been present on the 1955 slate, as well (as had the two remaining non-Ivy fixtures, Army and Rutgers).

Columbia played its home games at Baker Field in Upper Manhattan, in New York City.

Schedule

References

Columbia
Columbia Lions football seasons
Columbia Lions football